The TG4 Composer of the Year Award is given annually as part of Gradam Ceoil TG4.

The following is a list of the recipients of the award.
 2001 – Paddy Fahey, Co. Galway
 2002 – Brendan Tonra, Co. Mayo
 2003 – Vincent Broderick, Co. Galway
 2004 – Richie Dwyer, Co. Cork
 2005 – Josephine Keegan, Co. Armagh
 2006 – Charlie Lennon, Co. Leitrim
 2007 – Jim McGrath, Co. Fermanagh
 2008 – Peadar Ó Riada, Dublin
 2009 – Con Fada Ó Drisceoil, Co. Cork
 2010 – John Dwyer & Finbarr Dwyer, Co. Cork
 2011 – Liz Carroll, Chicago
 2012 – Paddy O'Brien, Co. Offaly
 2013 – Tommy Peoples, Co. Donegal
 2017 – Michael Rooney, Co. Monaghan

 2019 – Tríona Ní Dhomhnaill, Co. Meath
 2020 - Josephine Marsh, Co. Clare

References

Traditional music
Irish music awards